Sumatroscirpus is a genus of flowering plants belonging to the family Cyperaceae.

Its native range is Southern Central China to Indo-China, Sumatera.

Species:

Sumatroscirpus junghuhnii 
Sumatroscirpus minor 
Sumatroscirpus paniculatocorymbosus 
Sumatroscirpus rupestris

References

Cyperaceae
Cyperaceae genera